A medium-capacity system (MCS), also known as light rapid transit or light metro, is a rail transport system with a capacity greater than light rail, but less than typical heavy-rail rapid transit. MCS’s trains are usually 1-4 cars, or 1 light rail vehicle (LRV). Most medium-capacity rail systems are automated or use light rail type vehicles. Light rail is considered high capacity as trains use 2-4 LRVs.

Since ridership determines the scale of a rapid transit system, statistical modeling allows planners to size the rail system for the needs of the area. When the predicted ridership falls between the service requirements of a light rail and heavy rail or metro system, an MCS project is indicated. An MCS may also result when a rapid transit service fails to achieve the requisite ridership due to network inadequacies (e.g. single-tracking) or changing demographics.

In contrast with most light rail systems, an MCS usually runs on a fully grade separated exclusive right-of-way. In some cases, the distance between stations is much longer than typically found on heavy rail networks. An MCS may also be suitable for branch line connections to another mode of a heavy-capacity transportation system, such as an airport or a main route of a metro network.

Definition

The definition of a medium-capacity system varies due to its non-standardization. Inconsistencies in international definitions are even reflected within individual countries. For example, the Taiwan Ministry of Transportation and Communications states that each MCS system can board around 6,000–20,000 passengers per hour per direction (p/h/d or PPHPD), while the Taiwan Department of Rapid Transit Systems (TCG) suggests an MCS has a capability of boarding around 20,000–30,000 p/h/d, and a report from the World Bank places the capacity of an MCS at 15,000–30,000 p/h/d. For comparison,  ridership capacity of more than 30,000 p/h/d has been quoted as the standard for metro or "heavy rail" standards rapid transit systems, while light rail systems have passenger capacity volumes of around 10,000–12,000 p/h/d or 12,000–18,000 p/h/d. VAL (Véhicule Automatique Léger) systems are categorized in the medium-capacity rail systems because their manufacturer defines their passenger capacities as being up to 30,000 p/h/d. In Hong Kong, MTR's Ma On Shan line could, in some contexts, are classified as a medium-capacity system (as it used shorter four-car SP1950 trains) but can attain up to 32,000 p/h/d which is comparable to the passenger capacity of some full metro transit networks. This classification did not last for much longer as full-length, 8-car trains were being deployed on the line in advance of its extension and transformation into the Tuen Ma line in June 2021. Two other lines, the Disneyland Resort line shuttle service to Hong Kong Disneyland Resort since 2005 and the South Island line since December 2016, are also built to MCS standards.

Generally speaking, medium capacity designation is created from relative lower capacity and/or train configuration comparisons to other heavy rail systems in the same area. For example, the train in an MCS may have a shorter configuration than the standard metro system, usually three (though, in some cases, just two) to six traincars, allowing for shorter platforms to be built and used. Rather than using steel wheels, rubber-tyred metro technology, such as the VAL system used on the Taipei Metro, is sometimes recommended, due to its low running noise, as well as the ability to climb steeper grades and turn tighter curves, thus allowing more flexible alignments.

Fully heavy rail or metro systems generally have train headways of 10 minutes or better during peak hours. Some systems that qualify as heavy rail/metro in every other way (e.g. are fully grade separated), but which have network inadequacies (e.g. a section of single track rail) can only achieve lesser headways (e.g. every 15 minutes) which result in lower passenger volume capacities, and thus would be more accurately defined as "light metro" or "medium-capacity" systems as a result.

Terminology

In addition to MCS, light metro is a common alternative word in European countries, India, and South Korea.

In some countries, however, light metro systems are conflated with light rail. In South Korea, Light Rail is used as the translation for the original Korean term, "경전철" – its literal translation is "Light Metro", but it actually means "Any railway transit other than heavy rail, which has capacity between heavy rail and bus transit". For example, the U Line in Uijeongbu utilizes VAL system, a variant of medium-capacity rail transport, and is therefore categorized "light metro" by LRTA and others, though the operator itself and South Korean sources refer to the U Line as "light rail". Busan–Gimhae Light Rail Transit is also akin to a light metro in its appearance and features, thought the operator refers it as a "light rail". Likewise, Malaysian officials and media commonly refer to the Kelana Jaya, Ampang and Sri Petaling lines as "light rail transit" systems; when originally opened, the original Malay abbreviations for the lines, PUTRA-LRT (Projek Usahasama Transit Ringan Automatik/Automatic Light Transit Joint Venture Project) and STAR-LRT (Sistem Transit Aliran Ringan/Light Flow Transit System) did not clearly distinguish between light rail and light rapid transit. Some articles in India also refer to some "light metro"-type systems as "light rail". The Light Rail Transit Association (LRTA), a nonprofit organization, also categorizes several public transport systems as "light metro".

Advantages and disadvantages 
The main reason to build a light metro instead of a regular metro is to reduce costs, mainly because this system employs shorter vehicles and shorter stations.

Light metros may operate faster than heavy-rail rapid transit systems due to shorter dwell times at stations, and the faster acceleration and deceleration of lighter trains. For example, express trains on the New York City Subway are about as fast as the Vancouver SkyTrain, but these express trains skip most stops on lines where they operate.

Medium-capacity systems have restricted growth capacities as ridership increases. For example, it is difficult to extend station platforms once a system is in operation, especially for underground railway systems, since this work must be done without interfering with traffic. Some railway systems, like Hong Kong and Wuhan, may make advance provisions for longer platforms, for example, so that they will be able to accommodate trains with more, or longer cars, in the future. Taipei Metro, for example, constructed extra space for two extra cars in all its Wenhu Line stations.

List of medium-capacity rail systems

The following is the list of currently-operating MCSs which are categorized as light metros by the Light Rail Transit Association (LRTA) , unless otherwise indicated.

The list does not include, for example, monorails and urban maglev, despite most of them also being "medium-capacity rail system".

Former examples
The following is the list of former-MCSs that either developed into a full rapid transit system, or which are no longer in operation:

 Guangzhou, China 
 Line 3 – began with 3-car configuration, changed to 6-car in 2010.
 Komaki, Japan 
 Peachliner – abandoned on 30 September 2006.
 Sha Tin and Ma On Shan, Hong Kong
 Ma On Shan Rail – converted from four- to eight-car configuration and became part of Tuen Ma line.

See also

Automated guideway transit
Light rail
Maglev
Metro
Premetro
Passenger rail terminology
Rail transport
Rubber-tyred metro
People mover
VAL

Notes

References

Bibliography

External links
 Urban rail transit definitions by the US Transportation Research Board and the American Public Transportation Association
 Jane's Urban Transport Systems

Railways by type